Glen Glacier is a glacier at least  long, flowing south in the Shackleton Range of Antarctica to join Recovery Glacier to the west of the Read Mountains. It was first mapped in 1957 by the Commonwealth Trans-Antarctic Expedition (CTAE) and named for Alexander Richard "Sandy" Glen, a member of the Committee of Management of the CTAE, 1955–58.

See also
 List of glaciers in the Antarctic
 Glaciology

References

Glaciers of Coats Land